Shonkhonil Karagar is a Bangladeshi Bengali film released on May 22, 1992, and directed by Mustafizur Rahman. This film is based on the novel of prominent Bangladeshi writer Humayun Ahmed.

Cast
 Dolly Johur as Rabeya
 Asaduzzaman Noor as Khoka
 Suborna Mustafa as Runu
 Azizul Hakim as Montu
 Champa as Kitki
 Momtazuddin Ahmed as Motin Uddin
 Nazma Anwar as Shirin (Mrs. Motin Uddin)
 Abul Hayat as Abed Hossen
 Zafar Iqbal as Farid
 Mahmuda Khatun as house-help
 Syed Hasan Imam as Choto Khalu
 Minu Rahman as Choto Khala
 Nazmul Huda Bachchu
 Rawshan Zamil
 Masud Ali Khan as Motin Uddin's boss
 Kazi Mehfuzul Haque as Doctor
 Chhonda
 Shahidul Amin
 Md. Raushan Ali
 Anwar Hossain
 Badruzzaman
 Md. Kamruzzaman
 Abul Hossain
 Kazi Nadira Daisy
 Afsar Uddin Ahmed
 Arshad Ali

Soundtrack
The music of this film was directed by Khondokar Nurul Alam and lyrics were penned by Mohammad Rafiquzzaman. The singers are Andrew Kishore, Runa Laila and others.

Awards

See also
 Saajghor

References

External links
 
 Shonkhonil Karagar at the Bangla Movie Database

1992 films
1992 drama films
Films scored by Khandaker Nurul Alam
Bengali-language Bangladeshi films
1990s Bengali-language films
Bangladeshi war drama films
Best Film National Film Award (Bangladesh) winners